David Peter Gray (born 13 June 1968) is a British singer-songwriter. He released his first album in 1993 and received worldwide attention after the release of White Ladder six years later. White Ladder was the first of three UK chart-toppers in six years for Gray; it became the fifth best-selling album of the 2000s in the UK and ranked as the tenth best-selling album of the 21st century in the United Kingdom in October 2019. Gray is also known for the hit single "Babylon" from the White Ladder album. He has received four Brit Award nominations, including two nominations for Best British Male.

Career

Early life and career
Gray was born in 1968 in Sale, Greater Manchester, England, and lived in Altrincham Greater Manchester before moving with his family at the age of nine to Solva, Pembrokeshire, Wales, where his parents took over a gift shop and started a clothing business. "I had an amazing time growing up there... My imagination could run wild... It was that which gave me the kind of insane self-belief I have, and had even then, that I could do something as unlikely as play music for a living." He went to Ysgol Dewi Sant high school in nearby St Davids and then on to Carmarthenshire College of Art and finally Liverpool School of Art.

Gray's first two albums, A Century Ends and Flesh, were issued in 1993 and 1994 respectively and led to Gray becoming popular in folk-rock circles, but both failed in terms of commercial sales. In 1996 Gray released his third album, Sell, Sell, Sell. The album was recorded at Pyramid Sound Studios in Ithaca, NY. Despite his dislike of the album, Gray continued to maintain residence in Ithaca, NY on and off over the years. Despite critical acclaim, the album did not chart, but the song "Late Night Radio" received some airplay on alternative UK radio stations. On the 1997 Mary Black album Shine, Gray contributed five songs.

1998–2002: White Ladder and rise to fame
Originally released on Gray's own label IHT Records in November 1998, White Ladder was re-released in 2000 on ATO Records. The re-release brought him commercial success and critical attention. While his first three albums featured acoustic folk songs and guitar-based alternative rock, White Ladder introduced his now-trademark folktronic sound. The album included his best-known songs: "This Year's Love", "Babylon", "Please Forgive Me" and "Sail Away". After its re-release, combined with the release and success of single "Babylon", it sold 100,000 copies in Ireland alone, making it number one for six weeks, and according to a 2012 report was the biggest-selling album ever in that country. In June 2000, "Babylon" hit No. 5 in the UK Singles Chart; it remains his biggest UK hit to date. In the United States, the album received a boost from jam-band leader Dave Matthews, who made it the first release by ATO Records, the record company he co-founded. "Babylon" was also the first of three US chart entries for Gray to date.

The album was No. 1 on the UK Albums Chart, two years and five months after its original release, spending a total of 151 weeks on the chart. Aside from "Please Forgive Me", which charted at No. 72 on the UK Singles Chart, all other single releases charted within the Top 20: the re-released "Please Forgive Me" charted at number 18, and "Say Hello, Wave Goodbye" and "Sail Away" peaked at number 26.

The year 2001 also saw the release of a rarities compilation of Gray's early works, The EPs 1992-1994, as well as an album of previously unreleased songs recorded in 1999, Lost Songs 95-98, both of which followed White Ladder into the Top 20 in the UK Albums Chart. Gray also provided vocals on the electronic-based band Orbital's 2001 single "Illuminate".

In November 2002, Gray released the follow-up to White Ladder, entitled A New Day at Midnight. The new release did not receive the same critical acclaim as its predecessor, but still went straight in at number 1, famously beating Pop Idol runner-up Gareth Gates's debut album What My Heart Wants to Say to the summit and selling nearly 150,000 copies in its first week of release. It went on to achieve platinum status within a year, eventually being certified four times platinum overall, and was the second-biggest selling album by a UK artist in 2002, behind Pop Idol winner Will Young's debut album From Now On. A New Day at Midnight produced two further UK Top 30 hits in "The Other Side" and "Be Mine" and a minor US hit with "Dead in the Water".

Later career

After a three-year hiatus which saw him wind down his recording and touring schedule due to exhaustion, Gray returned with his seventh album, Life in Slow Motion, in September 2005. Like its predecessor, it topped the UK Albums Chart in its first week of release. After the much-criticised A New Day at Midnight, Life in Slow Motion was hailed as a return to form by many critics. Lead single "The One I Love" was a Top 10 hit in the UK in October 2005 and spent three months in the UK chart. Following the relative commercial failure of follow-up singles "Hospital Food" and "Alibi", Gray again went into hiatus during 2006.

In March 2007, Gray released the compilation album Shine: The Best of the Early Years. On 7 July 2007, Gray performed with Damien Rice at the UK leg of Live Earth at Wembley Stadium in London. Gray released a compilation CD of live covers entitled A Thousand Miles Behind exclusively through his official website on 8 October that year on CD and digital download. On 13 November, Gray released the album Greatest Hits, which includes many of his best known songs as well as two new songs, including the lead single "You're the World to Me".

On 28 May 2009, Gray announced that his album Draw the Line would be released on 14 September in the UK and on 22 September in the United States. The album features guest appearances by Annie Lennox and Jolie Holland. The album's first single, "Fugitive", was released on 7 September 2009, coinciding with the start of an expansive world tour. On 19 September, Gray performed his self-proclaimed first pool-side concert at the Rooftop Pool at The Colonnade Hotel in Boston for the Mix 104.1 End of Summer Bash. Gray performed songs from the new album, including "Fugitive", "Draw the Line" and "Jackdaw".

In an interview for Hot Press, released on 3 December 2009, Gray revealed to Jackie Hayden that he was working on his next album, Foundling. Gray said that one of the tracks would be called "The Old Chair", which, according to Gray, "features just a drum kit and me on my Steinway piano. It's very quiet." Foundling was released in the UK on 16 August. and in the United States on 17 August. Foundling is a double album: the first CD consists of 11 new songs and the second consists of eight previously unreleased songs. A ninth is available via iTunes.

David Gray signed a global agreement with Kobalt Label Services for the release of his 10th studio album, Mutineers. His first in four years, it was recorded at The Church Studios in London and produced by Andy Barlow (Lamb). The release took place on 17 June 2014. It was announced that Gray would support the new release with a North American tour through April and May, followed by an eight-date UK tour in June and July that included a show at the Royal Albert Hall in London.

The Best of David Gray was released on CD, double CD and LP in October 2016, and included two new recordings. The album, released in conjunction with IHT Records, had already been released as a dynamic playlist on Spotify that automatically changed shape every week Gray commented: "What we have on our hands is an ever-evolving 'Best Of' that is different every week, every month, every year, every decade."

In March 2019, Gray released his 11th record, Gold in a Brass Age. It was produced by Ben de Vries, son of producer Marius de Vries, and was seen largely as a return to his signature "folktronica" sound.

In the year 2020, Gray released a 20th anniversary edition of White Ladder. A deluxe set with bonus tracks and demos was also made available on both CD and vinyl formats. He embarked on an international tour to celebrate the anniversary, starting in Europe in February, but it was cut short due to the COVID-19 pandemic. Gray announced on 20 May 2020 via his social media channels that the tour had to be postponed. The tour kicked off in Belfast on the 17th of May 2022 nearly two years to the day it was cancellled. Gray has always credited Ireland for boosting his career with the original sales of White Ladder so it felt fitting to start the tour in Ireland. 

In January 2021, Gray announced that his 12th studio album was to be released on 19 February 2021. Entitled Skellig (named after the Skellig Islands in County Kerry, Ireland) it featured a title track and a single called "Heart and Soul". It was recorded at Edwyn Collins' Helmsdale studio in Scotland and features David Kitt, Rob Malone and producer Ben de Vries as musicians on the record.

Musical style
Gray's early music was in a contemporary folk-rock, singer-songwriter mode; his primary instrument was acoustic guitar, with occasional piano. 1996's Sell, Sell, Sell featured some rock arrangements and electric instrumentation. Starting with the release of White Ladder, Gray began to make significant use of computer-generated music to accompany his voice and acoustic instrumentation. A New Day at Midnight continued this direction, although lyrically it was darker in tone than White Ladder and the instrumentation much more downbeat. In the liner notes, Gray dedicated the album to his father, who died in 2001. Despite the move to more complex music, Gray has used small-scale, often home-based, recording methods and equipment and espoused a do-it-yourself approach to music production. However, 2005's Life in Slow Motion was a collaboration with the record producer Marius de Vries.

Band
 David Gray – vocals, guitars, piano & keyboards, harmonica
Rob Malone – bass guitar, backing vocals
Keith Prior – drums, percussion, backing vocals
Tim Bradshaw – keyboards, guitars, lap steel
John Smith – guitars, backing vocals (occasional touring member)
Caroline Dale – cello, piano, backing vocals (occasional touring member)
David Kitt – guitars, keyboards, backing vocals (occasional touring member)
Niamh Farrell – backing vocals, percussion (occasional touring member)

Former longterm band members:
Craig "Clune" McClune – drums, percussion, bass guitar, keyboards, backing vocals
David Nolte – guitar, bass guitar, keyboards, backing vocals
Neill MacColl – acoustic guitar, electric guitar, mandolin, backing vocals

Discography

A Century Ends (April 1993)
Flesh (September 1994)
Sell, Sell, Sell (August 1996)
White Ladder (March 1999)
Lost Songs 95–98 (July 2000)
A New Day at Midnight (October 2002)
Life in Slow Motion (September 2005)
Draw the Line (September 2009)
Foundling (August 2010)
Mutineers (June 2014)
Gold in a Brass Age (March 2019)
Skellig (February 2021)

Tours
Gray has been touring since 1993. Prior to his breakthrough album White Ladder in 1998, Gray had been the supporting act for the likes of Kirsty MacColl, Dave Matthews Band and Radiohead. He has had multiple tour dates in many different places such as Australia, Austria, Belgium, Canada, Denmark, Finland, France, Germany, Hungary, Ireland, Italy, Luxembourg, Netherlands, New Zealand, Norway, South Africa, Spain, Sweden, Switzerland, United Arab Emirates, United Kingdom and the United States.

Awards and nominations

BAFTA Awards

!Ref.
|-
| 2005
| A Way of Life
| Anthony Asquith Award for New British Composer
| 
|

Brit Awards

!Ref.
|-
| rowspan=3|2001
| Himself
| British Male Solo Artist
| 
| rowspan=3|
|-
| Lost Songs 95–98
| British Album of the Year
| 
|-
| "Babylon"
| British Single of the Year
| 
|-
| 2003
| Himself
| British Male Solo Artist
| 
| 

GQ Awards

!Ref.
|-
| 2002
| Himself
| Best Solo Artist
| 
|

Grammy Awards

!Ref.
|-
| 2002
| Himself
| Best New Artist
| 
| rowspan=2|
|-
| 2020
| Gold in a Brass Age
| Best Boxed or Special Limited Edition Package
| 

IFPI Platinum Europe Awards

!Ref.
|-
| 2000
| White Ladder
| Album Title
| 
| 

Ivor Novello Awards

|-
| rowspan=2|2001
| "Please Forgive Me"
| Best Contemporary Song 
| 
|-
| "Babylon"
| rowspan=3|Best Song Musically & Lyrically
| 
|-
| 2002
| "Sail Away"
| 
|-
|2003
| "The Other Side"
| 

MTV Video Music Awards

!Ref.
|-
| 2001
| "Babylon"
| Best New Artist in a Video
| 
|

Meteor Music Awards

|-
| rowspan=2|2001
| White Ladder
| Best International Album
| 
|-
| rowspan=3|Himself
| Best International Songwriter
| 
|-
| 2003
| rowspan=2|Best International Male
| 
|-
| 2006
| 

Pollstar Concert Industry Awards

!Ref.
|-
| 2001
| rowspan=2|Himself
| Best New Artist Tour
| 
|
|-
| 2011
| Most Creative Tour Package
| 
|

Pop Factory Awards

!Ref.
|-
| 2002
| A New Day at Midnight
| Best CD Release
| 
| 

Q Awards

|-
| 2000
| "Babylon"
| Best Single
| 
|-
| 2003
| Himself
| Innovation in Sound
|

Smash Hits Poll Winners Party

!Ref.
|-
| 2000
| Himself
| Best New Male Solo Star
| 
|

Personal life
Gray married his wife Olivia in Los Angeles, California in 1993, and together they have two daughters: Ivy and Florence. He lives in London, having moved to Hampstead in 2009. Gray is also the brother-in-law of Phil Hartnoll of Orbital.

In 2011, a portrait of Gray was painted by English artist Joe Simpson. The painting was exhibited around the UK, including at a solo exhibition at the Royal Albert Hall.

Gray is a Manchester United supporter. He said in 2005 that he is an atheist.

References

External links
 
 
 
 
 
 David Gray collection at the Internet Archive's live music archive
 David Gray Music in Australia

 
1968 births
ATO Records artists
Alternative rock guitarists
Alternative rock pianists
Alternative rock singers
British folk singers
British folk guitarists
British male guitarists
British male singers
British rock guitarists
British rock singers
British rock pianists
British male singer-songwriters
Folktronica musicians
Living people
British male pianists
Musicians from Greater Manchester
People from Altrincham
People from Pembrokeshire
People from Sale, Greater Manchester
Polydor Records artists